The Thailand Karen Baptist Convention is a Baptist Christian denomination in Thailand. It is affiliated with the Baptist World Alliance. The headquarters is in Chiang Mai.

History
The Thailand Karen Baptist Convention has its origins in a mission of the American Baptist International Ministries in 1833.  It is officially founded in 1955.  According to a denomination census released in 2020, it claimed 219 churches and 41,566 members.

References

External links
 Official Website

Baptist denominations in Asia
Evangelicalism in Thailand